Didzis Gavars (born 18 November 1966, Jūrmala, Latvian SSR) is a Latvian politician who was Minister of Health of Latvia from 13 May to 3 November 2010.

References

1966 births
Living people
People from Jūrmala
Latvian Green Party politicians
Ministers of Health of Latvia
Riga State Gymnasium No.1 alumni
Riga Stradiņš University alumni